The Department of Defense Medal for Distinguished Public Service is the highest award that is presented by the Secretary of Defense, to a private citizen, politician, non-career federal employee, or foreign national.  It is presented for exceptionally distinguished service of significance to the Department of Defense as a whole, or a DoD Component or function, where recognition at the component level would not be sufficient for the service rendered.

Eligibility

To be eligible for consideration the individual must have rendered exceptionally distinguished service of significance to the Department of Defense as a whole.  Recognition may also be given for distinguished service of such exceptional significance to a Department of Defense Component or Function that recognition at the Component level would be insufficient. The service or assistance may have been rendered at considerable personal sacrifice and inconvenience and should be motivated by patriotism, good citizenship, and a sense of public responsibility.

Normally, it is required that nominees have a direct working relationship with the most senior officials in the Federal government, e.g., Secretary of Defense, Deputy Secretary of Defense, Chairman, Joint Chiefs of Staff, Secretary of State.

An individual may receive this award more than once with subsequent awards consisting of a bronze, silver, or gold palm, respectively.

Description
The award consists of a gold medal, a miniature medal, a rosette, and a citation signed by the Secretary of Defense.

The obverse of the medal depicts an eagle facing to the right clutching three arrows, below the eagle is a half laurel wreath.  Above the eagle are thirteen stars with rays between the stars.  This imagery is identical to the seal of the Department of Defense.  The reverse contains the inscription "TO...FOR DISTINGUISHED PUBLIC SERVICE TO THE DEPARTMENT OF DEFENSE".  The edge of the medallion is surrounded by a laurel wreath on both the obverse and reverse.  The medal is suspended from ribbon containing one central strip in maroon, with a white stripe on each side separating it from two blue stripes, with a thin white stripe at each edge.

Notable recipients
Russell T. Vought
Madeleine Korbel Albright, 2016
Avi Berkowitz
Ehud Barak
George W. Bush
Peter Carington, 6th Baron Carrington
Ash Carter
Bill Clinton
Kristin Krohn Devold
Bob Hope
Deborah Lee James
Henry Kissinger
Shigeru Kitamura
Michael Kratsios
Jared Kushner
Judith A. Miller
Robert O'Brien
Barack Obama
Zohar Palti
Edward Angus Powell Jr.
Ronald Reagan
Paul Ryan
Dan Scavino
Steven Spielberg
Eric Schmidt
Manfred Woerner
Albert Wohlstetter

See also
 Awards and decorations of the United States government

References

External links
 Department of Defense-Level Honorary Awards Guide

Awards and decorations of the United States Department of Defense
Awards established in 1947
1947 establishments in the United States